Igor Ozerov (born 7 May 1968) is a Russian short track speed skater. He competed in two events at the 1994 Winter Olympics.

References

External links
 

1968 births
Living people
Russian male short track speed skaters
Olympic short track speed skaters of Russia
Short track speed skaters at the 1994 Winter Olympics
Speed skaters from Moscow